Plukenetieae is a tribe of plant of the family Euphorbiaceae. It comprises 3 subtribes and 14 genera. Tribe Plukenetieae (Benth.) Hutch. (Euphorbiaceae, Acalyphoideae) is a diverse pantropical lineage of ca. 17 genera and 350 species of twining vines and lianas, scandent to erect perennial herbs and subshrubs, and rarely shrubs and small trees.

See also
Taxonomy of the Euphorbiaceae

References

 
Euphorbiaceae tribes